Palos Blancos Municipality is the fourth municipal section of the Sud Yungas Province in the  La Paz Department, Bolivia. Its seat is Palos Blancos.

References 

 Instituto Nacional de Estadistica de Bolivia

Municipalities of La Paz Department (Bolivia)